Bernd Patzke (born 14 March 1943) is a German former football player and manager.

The defender was twice a squad member of the West Germany national team for FIFA World Cup tournaments: 1966 in England and 1970 in Mexico. Altogether he won 24 caps between 1965 and 1971.

Honours
1860 Munich
 Bundesliga: 1965–66

References

External links
 
 
 

1943 births
Living people
German footballers
Footballers from Berlin
Association football defenders
Germany international footballers
Standard Liège players
TSV 1860 Munich players
Hertha BSC players
1966 FIFA World Cup players
1970 FIFA World Cup players
Bundesliga players
Belgian Pro League players
German football managers
TSV 1860 Munich managers
Tennis Borussia Berlin managers
West German expatriate footballers
West German expatriate sportspeople in Belgium
Expatriate footballers in Belgium
German expatriate sportspeople in Oman
Expatriate football managers in Oman
West German expatriate sportspeople in South Africa
Expatriate soccer players in South Africa
German expatriate football managers
West German footballers
West German football managers